TextEdit is an open-source word processor and text editor, first featured in NeXT's NeXTSTEP and OPENSTEP. It is now distributed with macOS since Apple Inc.'s acquisition of NeXT, and available as a GNUstep application for other Unix-like operating systems such as Linux. It is powered by Apple Advanced Typography.

Implementation 
TextEdit replaced the text editor of previous Macintosh operating systems, SimpleText. TextEdit uses the Cocoa text system to read and write documents in Rich Text Format (RTF), Rich Text Format Directory, plain text, and HTML formats, and can open (but not save) old SimpleText files. It also has access to the operating system's built-in spell-checking service. The version included in Mac OS X v10.3 added the ability to read and write documents in Word format, and the version in Mac OS X v10.4 added the ability to read and write Word XML documents. The version included in Mac OS X v10.5 added read and write support for Office Open XML and OpenDocument Text. The version included in Mac OS X v10.6 added automatic spelling correction, support for data detectors, and text transformations. The version included in Mac OS X v10.7 added versioning of files, and Autosave similar to iOS.

Formatted text, justification, and even the inclusion of graphics and other multimedia elements are supported by TextEdit, as well as the ability to read and write to different character encodings, including Unicode (UTF-8 and UTF-16). TextEdit automatically adjusts letter spacing in addition to word spacing while justifying text. TextEdit does not support multiple columns of text.

The high-resolution TextEdit 1.5 icon found in Mac OS X versions starting with 10.5 (Leopard) features an extract from Apple's "Think different" ad campaign. This was replaced by a blank sheet of notebook paper in 10.10 (Yosemite).

Source code
Apple formerly distributed TextEdit's source code as part of the documentation of its integrated development environment (IDE) Xcode. On the Internet, the source code of TextEdit can be found in Apple's Mac Developer Library. The following quote is from the characteristic part of the BSD-3-Clause-compliant license text included in the source code:

See also
 List of word processors
 Comparison of word processors
 Office Open XML software
 OpenDocument software
 TextEdit (API)

References

External links

 TextEdit in Mac Developer Library (with source code)
 c2: TextEdit
 Enhanced TextEdit from WWDC presentation

Free word processors
MacOS-only software made by Apple Inc.
MacOS word processors
MacOS text editors
MacOS-only free software
Software that uses GNUstep
Software using the BSD license